The 1956 United States presidential election in New Mexico took place on November 6, 1956. All 48 states were part of the 1956 United States presidential election. State voters chose four electors to represent them in the Electoral College, which voted for President and Vice President.

New Mexico was won by incumbent President Dwight D. Eisenhower by a 16-point landslide. Running against Eisenhower was former Governor of Illinois Adlai Stevenson, whom Eisenhower had earlier defeated for the Presidency in 1952. This election reflected one of the last election cycles where the Democratic Party still had their post Civil War political domination of the Deep South. This was also the last United States presidential election when either major party nominee was born in the nineteenth century.

, this is the last election in which Rio Arriba County and San Miguel County voted for a Republican presidential candidate.

Results

Results by county

Notes

References

New Mexico
1956 New Mexico elections
1956